Angreau is a village of Wallonia and district of the municipality of Honnelles, located in the province of Hainaut, Belgium.

History 
The earliest mention of this locality is Angrellum (Latin: little Angre). In the first Middle Ages, Angreau was part of the stronghold of Angre, of which it was probably an outbuilding with a fortified tower.  Angreau has been a commune since the year 1250.

References

External links
 

Former municipalities of Hainaut (province)